Acacia startii is a shrub of the genus Acacia and the subgenus Phyllodineae. It is native to an area in the Gascoyne region of Western Australia.

Ecology
It blooms from July to August and produces green-yellow flowers.

See also
List of Acacia species

References

startii
Acacias of Western Australia
Taxa named by Bruce Maslin
Endemic flora of Western Australia